The herald (Scoliopteryx libatrix) is a moth of the family Erebidae. The species was first described by Carl Linnaeus in his 1758 10th edition of Systema Naturae. It is found throughout the Palearctic and Nearctic (Holarctic).

Technical description and variation

It has a wingspan of about 44 mm. The wings are ample; the forewing angled in the middle of the termen, concave between the angle and the acute apex. Forewing grey mixed with ochreous, with fuscous striae, posteriorly with a rosy tinge: the veins terminally whitish; an irregular median suffusion reaching from base to middle, orange red more or less mixed with yellow; inner and outer lines pale with dark edges; a white spot at base on median vein; a white dot represents the orbicular stigma; reniform formed of two black dots; hindwing fuscous, paler at base; ab. suffusa Tutt is a scarce dark form without the usual rosy tinge in the terminal area of forewing; ab. pallidior Spul. includes pale whitish grey looking examples; while pallida Spul. refers to pale more yellowish specimens from Turkestan.

Biology
The herald's flight period is between June and November, in one or two broods. During the winter the herald moth hibernates in dark, cool structures (e.g. cellars, barns and caves), returning to take wing again from March to June. Its habitat is woodland parks and gardens, and (perhaps consequently) the resting wing pattern resembles a dead, shrivelled leaf.

Herald caterpillars are a bright green shade common to many caterpillars. They are distinguished by the thin yellow lines running across the body between segments. When maturity is reached, they pupate between two leaves, in a white cocoon made of silk.

Food plants

Larval food plants include:
 Willow
 Aspen
 Poplar

As adults:
 Ivy blossom
 Ripe blackberries
 Ripe raspberries

References

External links

"A Nature Observer's Scrapbook"
"Scoliopteryx libatrix (Linnaeus, 1758)". Fauna Europaea. Retrieved 22 November 2019.

"08984 Scoliopteryx libatrix (Linnaeus, 1758) - Zackeneule, Zimteule, Krebssuppe". Lepiforum e.V. Retrieved 22 November 2019. 

Calpinae
Moths described in 1758
Moths of Asia
Moths of North America
Moths of Europe
Moths of Iceland
Moths of Japan
Moths of the Middle East
Taxa named by Carl Linnaeus